The 2006-07 Chicago Bulls season was the 41st season for the franchise in the National Basketball Association (NBA). The team finished with a record of 49-33 in the regular season and reached the second round of the NBA playoffs, making it, at the time, their most successful season since the retirement of Michael Jordan, but nevertheless leaving some doubt amongst fans as to whether the team could compete for an NBA championship in the near future. The Bulls had the best team defensive rating in the NBA.

In the playoffs, the Bulls swept the defending NBA champion Miami Heat in four games in the First Round, before losing to the Detroit Pistons in six games in the Semifinals.

Offseason
Whereas previous seasons under General Manager John Paxson focused mostly on allowing the young players which comprised the core of the Bulls' roster to develop, before the '06-'07 season Paxson made an expensive free-agent signing in the form of Ben Wallace. Many fans were excited about the veteran experience and star power Wallace brought to the team, though some questioned if he was the best fit for the team, as Wallace had always been known for his defense, and many believed that the Bulls' biggest problem was a lack of inside scoring.

On July 20, the Bulls traded Tyson Chandler to the New Orleans Hornets for J.R. Smith. However, six days later, Smith was traded again, this time to the Denver Nuggets, in exchange for Howard Eisley and two second-round draft picks.

NBA Draft

Regular season
The Bulls got off to a rocky start, posting a record of 3-9 in their first 12 games. The criticism by some in the offseason about the signing of Ben Wallace seemed to gain some validity, as Wallace appeared to show his age and was not always able to put up big rebounding numbers as he had been known for with the Pistons. However, as they had in the 2004-05 season in which they started 0-9, the Bulls performed better as the season went on and finished 49-33. The record was good enough to receive the #5 seed among the 8 teams qualifying for the Eastern Conference Playoffs. The Bulls, however, lost their final game of the season to the New Jersey Nets which would have boosted them to a #2 seed and given them an easier path to the Eastern Conference Finals.

Season standings

Record vs. opponents

Playoffs

|- align="center" bgcolor="#ccffcc"
| 1
| April 21
| Miami
| W 96–91
| Luol Deng (33)
| Ben Wallace (14)
| Ben Gordon (11)
| United Center22,183
| 1–0
|- align="center" bgcolor="#ccffcc"
| 2
| April 24
| Miami
| W 107–89
| Ben Gordon (27)
| Ben Gordon (7)
| Kirk Hinrich (8)
| United Center23,097
| 2–0
|- align="center" bgcolor="#ccffcc"
| 3
| April 27
| @ Miami
| W 104–96
| Ben Gordon (27)
| Luol Deng (11)
| Kirk Hinrich (6)
| American Airlines Arena20,280
| 3–0
|- align="center" bgcolor="#ccffcc"
| 4
| April 29
| @ Miami
| W 92–79
| Ben Gordon (24)
| Luol Deng (12)
| Gordon, Hinrich (4)
| American Airlines Arena20,283
| 4–0
|-

|- align="center" bgcolor="#ffcccc"
| 1
| May 5
| @ Detroit
| L 69–95
| Luol Deng (18)
| Wallace, Deng (8)
| Kirk Hinrich (6)
| The Palace of Auburn Hills22,076
| 0–1
|- align="center" bgcolor="#ffcccc"
| 2
| May 7
| @ Detroit
| L 87–108
| Tyrus Thomas (18)
| Ben Wallace (7)
| Kirk Hinrich (7)
| The Palace of Auburn Hills22,076
| 0–2
|- align="center" bgcolor="#ffcccc"
| 3
| May 10
| Detroit
| L 74–81
| Luol Deng (21)
| Luol Deng (14)
| Kirk Hinrich (7)
| United Center23,462
| 0–3
|- align="center" bgcolor="#ccffcc"
| 4
| May 13
| Detroit
| W 102–87
| Luol Deng (25)
| Ben Wallace (17)
| Kirk Hinrich (10)
| United Center23,099
| 1–3
|- align="center" bgcolor="#ccffcc"
| 5
| May 15
| @ Detroit
| W 108–92
| Ben Gordon (28)
| P. J. Brown (8)
| Kirk Hinrich (13)
| The Palace of Auburn Hills22,076
| 2–3
|- align="center" bgcolor="#ffcccc"
| 6
| May 17
| Detroit
| L 85–95
| P. J. Brown (20)
| Ben Wallace (7)
| Kirk Hinrich (11)
| United Center23,030
| 2–4
|-

Awards and records
 Luol Deng, NBA Sportsmanship Award
 Kirk Hinrich, NBA All-Defensive Second Team
 Ben Wallace, NBA All-Defensive Second Team
 Tyrus Thomas, NBA All-Rookie Team Second Team

Roster

Player statistics

Regular season

|-
| 
| 60 || 1 || 10.6 || .415 || .000 || .824 || 2.0 || .3 || .3 || .3 || 4.0
|-
| 
| 6 || 0 || 4.8 || .500 || . || . || .8 || 1.2 || .0 || .0 || 1.3
|-
| 
| 72 || 49 || 20.2 || .407 || .000 || .787 || 4.8 || .7 || .3 || .7 || 6.1
|-
| 
| style=";"| 82 || style=";"| 82 || style=";"| 37.5 || style=";"| .517 || .143 || .777 || 7.1 || 2.5 || 1.2 || .6 || 18.8
|-
| 
| 78 || 30 || 24.4 || .408 || .359 || .752 || 2.2 || 4.0 || .9 || .1 || 7.2
|-
| 
| style=";"| 82 || 51 || 33.0 || .455 || .413 || style=";"| .864 || 3.1 || 3.6 || .8 || .2 || style=";"| 21.4
|-
| 
| 54 || 1 || 10.8 || .473 || .000 || .789 || 2.0 || 1.1 || .6 || .1 || 2.5
|-
| 
| 80 || 80 || 35.5 || .448 || style=";"| .415 || .835 || 3.4 || style=";"| 6.3 || 1.3 || .3 || 16.6
|-
| 
| 33 || 0 || 7.0 || .386 || .000 || .731 || 1.7 || .6 || .3 || .0 || 2.2
|-
| 
| 53 || 31 || 26.5 || .467 || .383 || .848 || 5.7 || 1.1 || .5 || .5 || 14.1
|-
| 
| 71 || 4 || 12.2 || .426 || .357 || .511 || 2.2 || .8 || .5 || .2 || 3.6
|-
| 
| 48 || 0 || 8.0 || .433 || . || .561 || 2.5 || .6 || .2 || .2 || 3.2
|-
| 
| 72 || 4 || 13.4 || .475 || .000 || .606 || 3.7 || .6 || .6 || 1.1 || 5.2
|-
| 
| 77 || 77 || 35.0 || .453 || .200 || .408 || style=";"| 10.7 || 2.4 || style=";"| 1.4 || style=";"| 2.0 || 6.4
|}

Playoffs

|-
| 
| 5 || 0 || 6.8 || .167 || . || . || 1.4 || .2 || .2 || .2 || .8
|-
| 
| style=";"| 10 || style=";"| 10 || 22.8 || .493 || . || .739 || 4.7 || 1.2 || .8 || .2 || 8.3
|-
| 
| style=";"| 10 || style=";"| 10 || style=";"| 41.0 || .524 || .000 || .807 || 8.7 || 2.4 || 1.0 || .7 || style=";"| 22.2
|-
| 
| 9 || 0 || 19.1 || .290 || .316 || .800 || 1.8 || 2.3 || .3 || .1 || 3.6
|-
| 
| style=";"| 10 || style=";"| 10 || 39.5 || .415 || .436 || style=";"| .921 || 3.8 || 3.8 || .9 || .1 || 20.4
|-
| 
| 4 || 0 || 2.3 || .000 || . || . || .3 || .0 || .3 || .0 || .0
|-
| 
| style=";"| 10 || style=";"| 10 || 36.2 || .376 || .302 || .769 || 4.2 || style=";"| 7.5 || .9 || .3 || 12.1
|-
| 
| style=";"| 10 || 0 || 19.7 || .360 || .333 || .722 || 3.5 || .8 || .2 || .5 || 8.8
|-
| 
| 9 || 0 || 11.0 || .385 || .375 || .583 || 1.9 || .8 || .2 || .0 || 3.3
|-
| 
| 1 || 0 || 3.0 || .500 || . || .000 || .0 || .0 || .0 || .0 || 2.0
|-
| 
| style=";"| 10 || 0 || 12.2 || .390 || . || .633 || 3.4 || .6 || 1.0 || .5 || 5.1
|-
| 
| style=";"| 10 || style=";"| 10 || 36.9 || style=";"| .566 || .000 || .500 || style=";"| 9.5 || 1.4 || style=";"| 1.5 || style=";"| 1.7 || 8.7
|}

Transactions
 June 28, 2006: Drafted F LaMarcus Aldridge in the first round (2nd overall) of the 2006 NBA Draft
 June 28, 2006: Drafted F Rodney Carney in the first round (16th overall) of the 2006 NBA Draft
 June 28, 2006: Traded F LaMarcus Aldridge and a second-round draft pick to the Portland Trail Blazers for F Tyrus Thomas and F Viktor Khryapa
 June 28, 2006: Traded F Rodney Carney, a second-round draft pick and cash to the Philadelphia 76ers for G Thabo Sefolosha
 July 7, 2006: Waived F Othella Harrington
 July 13, 2006: Signed free agent C Ben Wallace
 July 14, 2006: Traded C Tyson Chandler to the New Orleans Hornets for F P. J. Brown and G J. R. Smith
 July 20, 2006: Traded G J. R. Smith to the Denver Nuggets for G Howard Eisley and two second-round draft picks
 July 31, 2006: Signed G Adrian Griffin
 August 18, 2006: Traded G Eddie Basden to the Cleveland Cavaliers for C Martynas Andriuskevicius
 October 30, 2006: Waived C Luke Schenscher
 October 31, 2006: Re-signed G Kirk Hinrich

References

Chicago
Chicago Bulls seasons
Chicago
Chicago